Long Way to Heaven is the fifth studio album by the Canadian heavy metal band Helix. This album was their third for Capitol Records, and there were bigger expectations from the band after the success of the previous Walkin' the Razor's Edge (featuring the hit "Rock You"). The first single was "Deep Cuts the Knife", co-written by Paul Hackman and Bob Halligan Jr. The song received heavy airplay in the U.S., gaining "double breaker" status, and in Canada was added to heavy video play on MuchMusic. Q107 in Toronto had the song riding at number 1 for several weeks on their "Top Ten at Ten". Their first tour to kick off the album was in Sweden where they became the first Canadian rock band ever to tour that country extensively. For this they achieved their first number 1 album in that country.

Returning to North America, they toured with Accept and Keel, as well as headlining dates.  They also played odd one-off dates with Meat Loaf and Heart.  While headlining in Newfoundland, a local band called KAOS opened for Helix.  This band featured Rainer and Cindy Wiechmann, who joined Helix 19 years later in 2004, on lead guitar and backup vocals respectively.

The second single released from the album was "The Kids Are All Shakin, a song inspired by a fan letter from Poland. The album went platinum in Canada and they headlined their first Canadian tour with the Headpins as the supporting act. The Long Way to Heaven album was released for the first time on CD in September 1999.

Track listing
 "The Kids Are All Shakin (Paul Hackman / Brian Vollmer) - 3:48
 "Deep Cuts the Knife" (Paul Hackman / Bob Halligan Jr.) - 4:01
 "Ride the Rocket" (Halligan / Brian Vollmer) - 3:24
 "Long Way to Heaven" (Daryl Gray / Paul Hackman / Brian Vollmer) - 3:34
 "House on Fire" (Paul Hackman / Brian Vollmer) - 4:15
 "Christine" (Brent Doerner / Paul Hackman / Brian Vollmer) - 3:34
 "Without You (Jasmine's Song)" (Brent Doerner / Paul Hackman / Brian Vollmer) - 3:40
 "School of Hard Knocks" (Brent Doerner / Daryl Gray / Paul Hackman / Brian Vollmer) - 4:06
 "Don't Touch the Merchandise" (Brent Doerner / Brian Vollmer) - 2:47
 "Bangin' Off-A-The Bricks" (Brent Doerner / Brian Vollmer) - 3:15

Video version
There was a remix made of "The Kids Are All Shakin which was used in the music video.  The audio track was not available for purchase until the Helix Deep Cuts compilation of 1999.

Personnel 
 Brian Vollmer – vocals
 Paul Hackman – guitar and vocals
 Brent "The Doctor – guitar and vocals
 Daryl Gray – bass and vocals
 Greg "Fritz" Hinz – drums

Additional personal 
 Ken Sinnaeve – additional bass

Production 
 Produced by Tom Treumuth and co-produced by Paul Hackman
 Mixed by David Whittman
 Robert Meecham – technician
 Heather Brown – art direction

Charts

Album

Singles

References

External links
 Sleaze Roxx

Helix (band) albums
1985 albums
Capitol Records albums